KJPN may refer to:

 Pentagon Army Heliport (ICAO code KJPN)
 KJPN (FM), a radio station (89.3 FM) licensed to serve Payson, Arizona, United States